Herman Andrews (December 23, 1907 – July 1964), nicknamed "Jabbo", was an American baseball outfielder in the Negro leagues. He played from 1930 to 1943 with several teams.

Baseball career
Andrews played for eleven teams in ten seasons of baseball, which was spread over five different leagues (which included both incarnations of the Negro National League, the Negro American League, the Negro Southern League, and the East-West League). He had two breaks between his start in 1930 and finale in 1942. In four of his ten seasons, he played on multiples teams, and it was his 58 games with the Indianapolis ABCs (1931, 1932) that he played the most games with in a 263 game career. In 1930, he batted .357 in 67 games for Birmingham, Memphis and Chicago, which included 46 runs batted in. The following year, he led the NNL in games played with 45, for which he batted .293 with 21 runs batted in. He batted .252 in 1932, but he rebounded in 1933 by leading the second incarnation of the Negro National League with a .398 batting average in 22 games played. He played less from 1936 on, batting .351 in just sixteen games before following it up with ten games in 1937 that saw him hit .107. He batted .250 in his second comeback attempt in 1942 with sixteen games.

References

External links
 and Baseball-Reference Black Baseball Stats and  Seamheads

African-American baseball players
Baseball outfielders
Baseball players from Ohio
Birmingham Black Barons players
Chicago American Giants players
Columbus Blue Birds players
Homestead Grays players
Indianapolis ABCs (1931–1933) players
Jacksonville Red Caps players
Memphis Red Sox players
New York Cubans players
Philadelphia Stars players
Pittsburgh Crawfords players
Washington Black Senators players
1907 births
1964 deaths
Place of death missing
Date of death missing
20th-century African-American sportspeople